Catherine, Katherine or Kathryn Sullivan may refer to:

 Kathryn D. Sullivan (born 1951), retired NASA astronaut, first American woman to walk in space
 Catherine Sullivan (born 1968), Chicago based artist
 Cathryn Sullivan, American acting coach
 Kathy Sullivan (Australian politician) (born 1942), Kathryn Sullivan, former Australian politician
 Kathy Sullivan (Katherine Sullivan), married name of the fictional character Kathy Beale

See also
Kathy Sullivan (disambiguation)
Kate Sullivan (disambiguation)
Katie Sullivan (disambiguation)
Kathleen Sullivan (disambiguation)